Tilyar Lake is one of the major tourist attractions in the Indian state of Haryana. It is 70 kilometers from New Delhi on the Delhi – Fazilka highway and is located close to the city of Rohtak in Haryana.

The Tilyar Lake is only 42 km from Delhi border and Tilyar Zoo at Rohtak is well maintained (entry fee: INR10 - adults, INR5 - kids) and worth visiting specially for families. Fishing is permissible at Tilyar Lake after paying INR200 fishing fee.

The lake lies in a  area and forms an integral part of the tourist setup, making it one of the greenest stretches in the adjoining area. The spacious lawns and the scenery on view make this resort a great place to relax, and people visit from as far away as Mumbai. It is also an excellent spot for watching a variety of birds that flock on the little island located in the middle of the lake. Entry to Tilyar lake is free. The lake complex also houses Rohtak Zoo.

Mini zoo

Haryana had many mini zoos spread across the state. In 2001 the Government of Haryana decided to shut these down and replace them with well developed viable zoos, this included setting up the zoo at Rohtak within Tilyar Lake complex. As a result, enclosures for housing animals and aviaries for birds were built. Visitor facilities such as landscaping, walkways & trials, gardens, hillocks, lakes, artificial waterfalls, cafe, visitor toilets & resting shelters, watch towers, drinking water facilities etc. were created. Entry is only INR 10 for adults and INR 5 for kids.

References

Rohtak district
Lakes of Haryana
Zoos in Haryana
Rohtak